The Prizefighter series was a professional boxing tournament created by boxing promoter Barry Hearn and aired on Sky Sports. The format has an initial eight fighters, who compete in four quarter-finals of  rounds (number and length of the rounds is same as in amateur boxing) followed by two semi-finals and one final all on the same night. The total prize money of the tournament is £80,000 with the winner of the tournament taking home £32,000, a figure that has increased from the initial top prize of £25,000 when the tournament first aired in April 2008. There have been 34 Prizefighter tournaments so far featuring 14 different weight divisions. The last tournament was held in 2015.

Prizefighter 1: The Heavyweights
The first Prizefighter took place at York Hall, Bethnal Green in April 2008. The event was televised live on Sky Sports and saw 8 heavyweight fighters compete for the title. Competitors for the first series were Martin Rogan, David Dolan, Dave Ferguson, Billy Bessey, Alex Ibbs, Darren Morgan, Paul Butlin and Colin Kenna.

Martin Rogan and David Dolan met in the final each boasting unbeaten records of 9-0. Rogan won after three rounds of boxing in which Dolan had been knocked down twice. Dolan was possibly still feeling the effects of a gruelling first round fight in which a punishing left hook from Darren Morgan had him out on his feet and holding on.

Prizefighter 2: The Heavyweights II
The second tournament was held at the Telewest Arena in Newcastle in September 2008, and involved Sam Sexton, Pele Reid, Luke Simpkin, Dave Ferguson, Chris Burton, David Ingleby, Lee Swaby and Darren Morgan. The draw for the first round of fights was made by reigning British champion Danny Williams. Speaking before the tournament, competitor Luke Simpkin said "This could change my life if I win it", initially a substitute he was brought in to replace Ian Millarvie who had sustained an injury. Of his tactics for the tournament Simpkin said "There’s no tactics involved in my game and attack is the best form of defence so I will just attack. You haven’t got much time to plan anything so I will just go out there, have a good time and try my best".

On the night it was the Norwich heavyweight Sam Sexton who came out on top with wins over Pelé Reid in the quarter-final, Luke Simpkin in the semi-finals and the hometown favourite Chris Burton in the final. After the win Sexton praised his tactics saying "The night went exactly how we planned it, we had a gameplan for each fight worked out before we came tonight". On his future aspirations he added "At 24-years-old I still haven't got my man strength as yet, and I know I can keep improving, hopefully next year I can get a shot at British title, I will keep getting stronger and stronger."

Prizefighter 3: The Welterweights
Prizefighter 3 took place on 24 October 2008 back at the York Hall and featured a different weight class to the previous two events with welterweights competing for the main prize. Fighters taking part in the competition were former European champion Ted Bami; English champions Nigel Wright and Ross Minter; Former ABA champion Michael Lomax; Commonwealth challenger Craig Dickson; Midlands Area champion Mark Lloyd; Former IBO light middleweight champion Steven Conway, and Andrew Ferrans.

Michael Lomax won the tournament with wins over Craig Dickson, Nigel Wright and Ted Bami in the final. Lomax had been confident before the tournament had even begun despite not being the favourite to lift the trophy saying "I am confident I'll win...no one is as dedicated as me, what you put in is what you get out". He claimed that it was the best night of his career so far and raised hopes that this was the launchpad for his career saying "Hopefully this will be the break my career needs and as I said afterwards this wasn't about the money I won, but the glory I have enjoyed from this competition." The result wasn't without controversy however as many people watching at ringside as well as the commentators on Sky thought that Lomax had actually lost his semi-final against Nigel Wright. The judges however thought differently and scored a split decision win for the eventual champion. A shocked Wright speaking after the bout said "I'm absolutely disgusted – how could they rob me like that...One judge gave Lomax all three which is unbelievable...I can't remember Michael hitting me with a clean shot."

Prizefighter 4: The Middleweights
Prizefighter 4 took place again at the York Hall this time on 21 November 2008. The tournament featured Middleweights Paul Samuels, Danny Butler, Max Maxwell, Steve Ede, Cello Renda, Danny Thornton, Joe Rea and Martin Murray.  It also formed part of a Sky Box Office show featuring the Ricky Hatton fight with Paulie Malignaggi as the main event.

Martin Murray won the tournament and the £25,000 prize money following wins over Joe Rea, Danny Butler and then in the final Cello Renda. The final itself saw Renda getting knocked down and with both fighters coming out swinging and fighting toe to toe.

Prizefighter 5: The Light Heavyweights
The fifth instalment of the Prizefighter franchise took place on 20 February 2009 with the weight division on this occasion being light heavyweight. Boxers taking part in the competition were Courtney Fry, Shon Davies, Tony Oakey, Billy Boyle, Bob Ajisafe, Carl Dilks, Darren Stubbs and Steve Spartacus.  Former British champion Tony Oakey eventually won the tournament having defeated Billy Boyle and Courtney Fry on the way to a final win over Darren Stubbs.

Prizefighter 6: The Lightweights
The sixth installment of the Prizefighter franchise took place on 24 March 2009 at the Kelvin Hall, Scotland with the weight division on this occasion being lightweight. Boxers taking part in the competition were Ryan Brawley, Ben Murphy, Paul Holborn, Charlie King, Gary McArthur, Steve Saville, Stephen Burke and Stuart Green. Brawley won the tournament with victories over Murphy, Holborn and Burke in the final.

Prizefighter 7: The Cruiserweights
The seventh instalment of the Prizefighter franchise took place on 19 May 2009 at Earls Court Exhibition Centre, London with the weight division on this occasion being cruiserweight. Boxers taking part in the competition were Darren Corbett, Terry Dunstan, Dean Francis, John Keeton, Ovill McKenzie, Bruce Scott, Neil Simpson (boxer)|Neil Simpson and Mickey Steeds. Mark Krence was originally drafted in, but replaced by McKenzie after he was forced to withdraw due to injury.  McKenize went on to win the title scoring wins over Dunstan, Corbett and Keeton in the final.

Prizefighter 8: The Heavyweights III
The eighth tournament was held on 2 October 2009, it was originally due to be held at the York Hall in Bethnal Green, but was moved to the larger ExCeL London due to demand for tickets, increasing the potential attendance by 5,000. The boxers involved initially were Danny Williams, Audley Harrison, Michael Sprott, Scott Gammer, Scott Belshaw, Michael Holden, Coleman Barrett and Danny Hughes.

Carl Baker was eventually drafted in to take the place of Michael Holden after the BBBofC refused permission for Holden to fight after voicing concerns over his lack of activity over recent years in the ring. Sprott withdrew following a family bereavement and was replaced by Neil Perkins.

The quarter final draw took place on 11 September at the Mandalay Bay Resort and Casino in Las Vegas, Nevada by Mike Tyson alongside Matchroom Sports chairman Barry Hearn.

Former Olympic gold medalist Audley Harrison eventually won the title having defeated Scott Belshaw, Danny Hughes and Coleman Barrett.  Reigning British heavyweight champion Danny Williams, lost in the first round to substitute boxer Carl Baker, with Baker knocking him down four times over the course of the three round contest. The defeat to Baker also meant that Williams would be stripped of his British title.

Prizefighter 9: The Light Welterweights
On 4 December 2009, the tournament saw the light welterweight's competing for the first time. Amongst the contestants was Gavin Rees, the first former World champion to compete in the tournament's history. The competition also had a number of European champions competing with Colin Lynes, Jason Cook and Ted Bami, a man who had also reached the final of the Welterweight prizefighter tournament in October 2008. Former British champions David Barnes and Young Mutley also took part as did unbeaten fighter Michael Grant and Welshman Barrie Jones. The draw for the competition was conducted by Floyd Mayweather Jr.

Gavin Rees, who was supported at ringside by Joe Calzaghe, eventually picked up the trophy and £32,000 prize money after defeating all three former European champions in Ted Bami, Jason Cook and Colin Lynes in the final.

Prizefighter 10: The Light Middleweights
On 26 February 2010, Prizefighter returned to the York Hall and featured the first outing for the light middleweight division.  Among the contestants were former British champion Neil Sinclair and former Commonwealth champion Bradley Pryce.  The tournament also featured former middleweight semi finalist Danny Butler, Midlands Area champion Martin Concepcion, unbeaten boxers Steve O'Meara and Brett Flournoy as well as George Hillyard and Prince Arron.

In a tournament that proved difficult to predict, Droylsden boxer Prince Arron scored an upset win after beating Hillyard in the quarter final, Pryce in the semis and then knocking down the unbeaten former ABA champion Flournoy in the final.

Prizefighter 11: The Cruiserweights II
On 30 April 2010, Prizefighter was at the York Hall once again and featured the second outing for the cruiserweight division.  The main contender was two-time WBO world heavyweight champion Herbie Hide. Also in contention were former Commonwealth champion Darren Corbett and unbeaten prospect Jon-Lewis Dickinson.  The tournament also featured former English heavyweight champion Mark Krence as well as novices Leon Williams, Zahid Kahut, John Anthony and Wayne Brooks.

Hide comfortably won his quarter-final against Brooks but suffered a cut after a clash of heads in the bout. He was forced to withdraw and was replaced by reserve Nick Okoth, a firefighter, who had been at work earlier in the day. He won a coin toss against Preston's Paul Morris to replace Hide. Journeyman Okoth, who had a record of 8-27-5 going into the tournament, pulled off the biggest win of his career with a UD victory against Corbett and faced Dickinson in the final who had knocked out Krence in his semi final bout. Dickinson dominated the final and knocked out Okoth in the final round to take the trophy and £32,000 cash prize.

Prizefighter 12: The Super Bantamweights
On 29 May 2010, Prizefighter was at the York Hall once again and featured the first outing for the super-bantamweight division.  The original line-up included former WBC world bantamweight champion Wayne McCullough, former British, Commonwealth and European champion Esham Pickering, former English champion Mark Moran and unbeaten prospects Craig Lyon and Ricky Owen. Josh Wale, Chris Riley and Gavin Reid completed the line up. McCullough, Lyon and Riley withdrew in the weeks leading up to the tournament and were replaced by 2002 Commonwealth Games gold medallist Jamie Arthur, undefeated Irishman Willie Casey, and Robbie Turley.

The opening bout between Moran and Casey was the only one to finish inside the distance. The remaining quarter-finals were all decided on split decisions with Pickering being the main casualty, being defeated by Josh Wale. In the semi-finals, Casey defeated Wale in a thrilling contest in which 532 punches were thrown in just three rounds. Owen maintained his unbeaten record with a victory over Jamie Arthur, however he was unable to progress to the final after injuries sustained in the fight. He was forced to withdraw and was replaced by young Paul McElhinney, a Scotsman who was undefeated in four fights and won a coin toss against Slough's Ian Bailey to replace Owen. Despite having already fought two bouts Casey was able to win the final by unanimous decision.

Prizefighter 13: The Super Middleweights
On 30 June 2010, the first ever super middleweights Prizefighter took place in  York Hall, London. The original line up featured former British champions Tony Dodson and Tony Quigley, former English champion Paul David, former BBofC Celtic champion Stevie McGuire, former British Masters champion Eddie McIntosh, as well as Daniel Cadman and Peter Fedorenko. For the first time, it was decided that the eighth competitor would be decided by an online public vote. The winner of the vote was former BBofC Southern Area champion Tony Salam. In the buildup to the event, Dodson, McGuire, Quigley and Salam all withdrew, and were replaced by Gambia-born Patrick Mendy, who at 19 years old was the youngest ever Prizefighter contender, former Midlands Area champion Sam Horton, former Western Area champion Carl Drake, and unbeaten Welshman Jeff Evans.

Mendy was the eventual winner of the tournament, breaking the record for fastest Prizefighter knockout when he defeated Sam Horton after 82 seconds, and then became the youngest Prizefighter winner as well as competitor when he defeated Paul David in the final.

Prizefighter 14: The Heavyweights IV
On 9 October 2010, the York Hall played host to the fourth outing for the heavyweights as part of the Prizefighter series. Contestants taking part included the former British, European and Commonwealth champion Matt Skelton and the former British and Commonwealth champion Michael Sprott. Other boxers taking part included Kevin McBride, the last man to beat Mike Tyson, Franklin Egobi, Ali Adams, Shane McPhilbin, Declan Timlin and Danny Hughes. The tournament was won by Sprott who beat Danny Hughes in the quarter finals, Shane McPhilbin in the semis and Matt Skelton in the final. The fight against Skelton in particular was notable for Sprott in that it was the third time the two had met in the ring with Skelton having won the previous two fights. Sprott himself was also coming into the tournament on the back of a defeat in a European title challenge to Audley Harrison, the winner of the previous Prizefighter tournament featuring heavyweights.

Prizefighter 15: The Super Featherweights
On 21 November 2010, again at the York Hall, the 15th installment of the Prizefighter competition showcased boxers from the super featherweight division for the first time. Contestants taking part included the reigning British champion Gary Sykes and a former British and European title challenger in Gary Buckland. Ben Murphy and Gary McArthur had both previously contested the lightweight installment of the Prizefighter tournament on 24 March 2009. Choi Tseveenpurev, the WBU title holder, Derry Mathews, the former WBU title holder, Stevie Bell and Scott Lawton made up the rest of the competitors.

The competition resulted in a win for Gary Buckland who met Derry Mathews in the final and scored a second-round KO over the Liverpool man.  Buckland had fought his way to the final beating the likes of Stevie Bell in the quarters and Gary Sykes in the semis.  The win over Sykes in particular was notable in that the reigning British champion had chosen to compete in the tournament only to suffer a shock first-round knockout.

Prizefighter 16: The Light Heavyweights II
On 29 January 2011, at the Olympia, London, the 16th installment of the Prizefighter competition showcased boxers from the light heavyweight division for the second time. Former British champion Tony Dodson was the biggest name involved.

The winner of the tournament was Travis Dickinson, whose brother Jon-Lewis Dickinson won Prizefighter at cruiserweight in April 2010. Dickinson beat Llewellyn Davies, Justin Jones and Sam Couzens to win the title - Jones and Couzens stepping in as reserves after the withdrawals of Dodson and Jack Morris due to injury.

Prizefighter 17: The Super Middleweights II
The second version of the super middleweight tournament took place in Liverpool on 23 March 2011 and saw a hometown winner in Rocky Fielding.  Fielding became the first man to win the tournament by scoring three stoppages in a row beating the likes of Patrick J Maxwell (stoppage in the 2nd), Joe Ainscough (stoppage in the 1st) and Tobias Webb (stoppage in the 1st).

Prizefighter 18: The International Heavyweights
On 7 May 2011, at Alexandra Palace, London, the 18th installment of the Prizefighter competition showcased an international field of boxers from heavyweight division for the first time.

The winner of the tournament was Mike Perez. Perez beat Kerston Manswell, Gregory Tony and Tye Fields to win the title - dispatching both opponents in the semi-final and final, Tony and Fields respectively, by first round stoppage.

Prizefighter 19: The Welterweights II
On 7 June 2011, at York Hall, Bethnal Green, the 19th installment of the Prizefighter competition showcased a field of boxers from the welterweight division for the second time that included former world champion Junior Witter.

Moroccan fighter Yassine El maachi won the tournament, beating Peter McDonagh, Colin Lynes and pre-tournament favourite Junior Witter by unanimous, split and majority decisions respectively to claim the Prizefighter trophy.

El Maachi suffered a serious knee injury and has not boxed since.

Prizefighter 20: The Light Middleweights II
On 15 September 2011, at York Hall, Bethnal Green, the 20th installment of the Prizefighter competition showcased a field of boxers from the light middleweight division.

Robert Lloyd-Taylor won the tournament, beating Takaloo by split decision in the quarter-finals, Peter Vaughan by TKO 15 seconds from the end of the semi-final and earned a unanimous points victory over Liverpudlian Nick Quigley in the final.

 
^ Kris Agyei-Dua won 29-28 on referee Terry O'Connor's card after the judges scored the contest a majority draw.

Prizefighter 21: The Super Flyweights
On 12 October 2011, at the Liverpool Olympia, the 21st installment of the Prizefighter competition showcased a field of boxers from the super flyweight division for the first time.

Lee Haskins won the tournament, getting through all his fights by unanimous decision. He beat Terry Broadbent in the quarter-final, Ryan Farrag in the semi-final and overcame Don Broadhurst in the final.

Prizefighter 22: The Featherweights
On 29 October 2011, at York Hall, Bethnal Green, the 22nd installment of the Prizefighter competition showcased another weight division first, this time it was a field of boxers from the featherweight division.

Mongolian veteran Choi Tseveenpurev won the tournament, with the fan-favorite beating Lee Glover in the quarter-final with a second-round KO, before eliminating George Jupp in the semi-final and overcoming Welshman Rhys Roberts in the final.

Prizefighter 23: The Light Welterweights II
On 11 February 2012, at Civic Hall, Wolverhampton, the 23rd installment of the Prizefighter competition showcased fighters from the light-welterweight division for the second time.

Rising star Adil Anwar won the tournament, winning all three of his fights by unanimous decision. Anwar beat Barry Morrison in the quarter-final, before eliminating the heavily supported John Watson in the semi-final and overcame a spirited effort from Tyrone Nurse in the final to lift the Prizefighter trophy.

Prizefighter 24: All-Irish Middleweights
On 5 May 2012, the Prizefighter series went to Belfast for the first time. At the King's Hall, Belfast, the 24th installment of the Prizefighter competition showcased Irish fighters from the middleweight division. It was the first Prizefighter event that Betfair were title sponsors.

Former amateur star Eamonn O'Kane won the tournament to the crowd's delight. He beat Anthony Fitzgerald by split decision in the quarter-final, before eliminating Ryan Greene in the semi-final with a brutal first-round knockout and overcame the long reach of JJ McDonagh in the final to take home the £32,000 winners cheque.

Prizefighter 25: The International Heavyweights II
On 20 June 2012, at York Hall, Bethnal Green, the 25th installment of the Prizefighter competition showcased an international field of fighters from the heavyweight division for the second time. In a first for Prizefighter, grime star Clement Marfo performed his single 'Champion' in the ring before the action begun.

American Tor Hamer shocked the bookies when he beat the pre-tournament favorite, Kevin Johnson, in the final to win the £32,000. Hamer, who holds a university degree, had beaten the Brazilian big hitter Marcelo Luiz Nascimento in the quarters and the Englishman Tom Dallas in the semis to reach the last two.

Prizefighter 26: The Lightweights II
On 6 October 2012, at Liverpool Olympia, the 26th installment of the Prizefighter competition showcased field of Liverpudlian and Mancunian fighters from the lightweight division. Dubbed 'Rocky and the Betfair Prizefighters', previous Prizefighter winner Rocky Fielding took on Carl Dilks for the vacant English super-middleweight title after the Prizefighter tournament. The eight man line-up was described by many in the build-up as the best ever and included former British title holders Derry Mathews, Gary Sykes and Anthony Crolla.

Mancunian Terry Flanagan defied the odds to maintain his unbeaten record and win the coveted Betfair Prizefighter trophy. Flanagan, a 10-1 shot at the start of the night, claimed the £32,000 winner's cheque with a split decision victory over Gary Sykes in the final, having overcome Patrick Liam Walsh in his quarter-final and a bloodied Derry Mathews in the semi-final.

Prizefighter 27: The Light Middleweights III
On 3 November 2012, at York Hall, Bethnal Green, the 27th installment of the Prizefighter competition showcased a field of fighters from the light middleweight division. The eight participants were: Craig McEwan 21(10)-2, Navid Mansouri 8(3)-0-1, Curtis Valentine 5(4)-2, Terry Carruthers 11(1)-13-6, Kris Carslaw 16(4)-2, Ryan Toms 11(6)-3-1, Larry Ekundayo 2(1)-0 and Peter Vaughan 6(1)-1-1.

In the buildup to the competition promoter Eddie Hearn announced that he had added a new knockout bonus, with £2,000 handed out for every stoppage on the night. "I think the new knockout bonus will make things very interesting," said Hearn. "The last Prizefighter in Liverpool was a cracker but we didn't have one stoppage or KO in the event. It's what the fans want to see and with this incentive, I believe the fighters will be more inclined to get their opponent out of there before the final bell."

Local fighter Larry Ekundayo, coming into the competition with only two fight's experience, defied the odds to win the coveted Betfair Prizefighter trophy. Ekundayo, who became his manager Spencer Fearon's second Prizefighter champ after Choi won last year, claimed the £32,000 winner's cheque plus a £2,000 KO bonus with a stoppage victory over Terry Carruthers in the final. He had previously beaten two Scot's to get there with a win over the pre-tournament favourite, Craig McEwan, in the opening quarter-final and Kris Carslaw in the semi.

Prizefighter 28: The Welterweights III
On 19 January 2013, at the Civic Hall, Wolverhampton, the 28th installment of the Prizefighter competition showcased a field of fighters from the welterweight division. The tournament saw the greatest number of unbeaten fighters enter, with six men starting the night with their '0' intact. The eight participants were: Mark Thompson 24(14)-2, Rob Hunt 16(1)-1-2, Sam Eggington 3(0)-0, Dale Evans 4(3)-0-1, Chad Gaynor 9(4)-0, Calum Cooper 4(0)-0, Steven Pearce 6(1)-0 and Glenn Foot 7(4)-0.

Sunderland fighter Glenn Foot maintained his unbeaten record to win the new-look Betfair Prizefighter trophy. Foot claimed the £32,000 winner's cheque as well as the £2,000 stoppage bonus the 24-year-old earned after a second-round TKO victory over Steven Pearce in the quarter-final. Foot overcome Chad Gaynor in an absorbing semi-final contest before edging out Welsh 21-year-old Dale Evans in the final.

Prizefighter 29: The International Heavyweights III
On 23 February 2013, at York Hall in Bethnal Green, London, the 29th installment of the Prizefighter competition showcased an international field of eight heavyweight fighters from five different countries.

The tournament saw two fighters hoping to become second time Prizefighter champions, Audley Harrison and Martin Rogan. The other six participants were: Derric Rossy, Ian Lewison, Travis Walker, Albert Sosnowski, Claus Bertino and Timo Hoffmann.

Audley Harrison, 2000 Olympics gold medalist, rolled back the years to become the first ever two-time Prizefighter champion and win the new-look Betfair Prizefighter trophy. He claimed the £32,000 winner's cheque as well as £4,000 in stoppage bonuses the 41-year-old earned after TKO victories in the quarter-final and the final. Harrison overcome Martin Rogan, keeping the Belfast fighter at the end of his jab, in an absorbing semi-final contest before stopping American Derric Rossy in the second round of the final.

Prizefighter 30: The Cruiserweights III
On 18 May 2013, at York Hall in Bethnal Green, London, the 30th installment of the Prizefighter competition showcased a field of eight Cruiserweight fighters from the UK.

The tournament saw one of the most inexperienced fields seen in Prizefighter. Danny McIntosh (13-4), coming down from light-heavyweight, with 17 bouts on his record was the veteran of the group. The other six participants were: Wadi Camacho (6-1), Conall Carmichael (4-0), Tony Conquest (10-1), Neil Dawson (11-1), Shane McPhilbin (8-6), Nathan Owens (5-0-1) and Hari Miles (7-7).

Prizefighter 31: The Light Welterweights III
On 6 July 2013, at York Hall in Bethnal Green, London, the 31st installment of the Prizefighter competition showcased a field of eight light-welterweight fighters from the UK.

The tournament saw an almost exclusive field of London-based fighters take part in this edition of Prizefighter. Eventual winner, Welshman Chris Jenkins (7-0), came in to replace injured Chris Evangelou to buck the cockney trend. The other seven participants were: Southern Area champ Danny Connor (8-5-1), Southern Area lightweight belt holder Liam Shinkwin (6-0-1), Charlie Rice (6-0), Ryan Taylor (7-1-1), Matty Tew (12-1), Eren Arif (3-0) and Tony Owen (14-1).

Prizefighter 32: UK vs. USA International Heavyweights
On 14 November 2013, at York Hall in Bethnal Green, London, the 32nd installment of the Prizefighter competition showcased a field of eight heavyweight fighters from the UK and the USA.

The tournament saw a field of eight fighters, four from the UK and four from the US, take part in this special edition of Prizefighter.

Former Prizefighter finalist Michael Sprott was joined by Hackney's Larry Olubamiwo, Milton Keynes’ Matt Legg and Hertfordshire's Tom Little in Team UK, who faced up to a Team USA boasting former three-weight World Champion James Toney in its ranks. Toney was joined in the US quartet by Californian Damian Wills, former World Cruiserweight challenger Brian Minto and Florida's Jason Gavern.

In the Prizefighter prospect slots, Olympic Gold medal hero Anthony Joshua MBE fought Croatian Hrvoje Kisicek in his third pro fight while Cruiserweight prospect Ben Ileyemi clashed with Moses Matovu in his second pro outing.

Prizefighter 33: The Lightweights III
On 6 December 2014, at York Hall in Bethnal Green, London, the 33rd installment of the Prizefighter competition showcased a field of eight lightweight fighters from the UK and Ireland.

The tournament competitors were: Stephen Foster, Michael Devine, Danny Connor, Gary Buckland, Lee Martin, Floyd Moore, Jono Carroll and Craig Whyatt.

Prizefighter 34: The Welterweights IV
On 5 April 2014, at York Hall in Bethnal Green, London, the 34th installment of the Prizefighter competition showcased a field of eight welterweight fighters from the UK.

The tournament competitors were: Dean Byrne (17-3-1), Jason Cook (30-5-1), Johnny Coyle (3-0-1), Mark Douglas (8-3), Sam Eggington (8-1), Paddy Gallagher (4-0), Johnny Garton (11-0) and Erick Ochieng (14-0).

Prizefighter 35: The Middleweights III
On 14 February 2015, at the Winter Gardens in Blackpool, the 35th installment of the Prizefighter competition showcased a field of eight middleweight fighters from the UK.

The tournament competitors were: Jack Arnfield (17-0), Liam Conroy (7-2-0), Luke Crowcroft (8-1), Craig Cunningham (11-0), Tom Doran (11-0), Mick Hall (11-0), Luke Keeler (7-0) and Cello Renda (25-10-2) .

Tournament summary

References

External links
 Official website

British sports television series
Boxing competitions
Sky UK original programming